Heparan sulfate glucosamine 3-O-sulfotransferase 3A1 is an enzyme that in humans is encoded by the HS3ST3A1 gene.

Heparan sulfate biosynthetic enzymes are key components in generating myriad distinct heparan sulfate fine structures that carry out multiple biologic activities. The enzyme encoded by this gene is a member of the heparan sulfate biosynthetic enzyme family. 

It is a type II integral membrane protein and possesses heparan sulfate glucosaminyl 3-O-sulfotransferase activity. The sulfotransferase domain of this enzyme is highly similar to the same domain of heparan sulfate D-glucosaminyl 3-O-sulfotransferase 3A1, and these two enzymes sulfate an identical disaccharide. This gene is widely expressed, with the most abundant expression in the liver and placenta.

References

Further reading